The Blues Foundation is an American nonprofit corporation, headquartered in Memphis, Tennessee, that is affiliated with more than 175 blues organizations from various parts of the world.
Founded in 1980, a 25-person board of directors governs the foundation whose stated mission is to preserve blues heritage, celebrate blues recording and performance, and expand worldwide awareness of the blues.

On its formation, the foundation organized the annual W. C. Handy Awards to "give recognition of the finest in blues performances and recordings." The awards have since been renamed the Blues Music Awards. The BMAs are generally recognized as the highest honor given to blues musicians, and are awarded by vote of Blues Foundation members.

The Blues Foundation is also responsible for the Blues Hall of Fame Museum, International Blues Challenge (IBC), Keeping the Blues Alive Award (KBA) and Blues in the Schools program.

Every year, the Blues Foundation presents the KBA Awards to individuals and organizations that have made significant contributions to blues music. The KBA ceremony are held in conjunction with the International Blues Challenge. The KBAs are awarded on the basis of merit, by a select panel of blues professionals, working to actively promote and document the music.

The foundation established the HART Fund (Handy Artists Relief Trust) for blues musicians, and their families in financial need, due to a broad range of health concerns. The HART Fund provides for acute, chronic and preventive medical and dental care, as well as funeral expenses.

Barbara B. Newman succeeded Jay Sieleman, as president and chief executive officer of the Blues Foundation on October 1, 2015.

Affiliated members
Block Magazine
Delta Cultural Center
Ground Zero Blues Club
Inland Empire Blues Society
Kentuckiana Blues Society (KBS) 
National Endowment for the Humanities (NEH) 
Knuckleheads Saloon

See also
Blues Hall of Fame
Blues Music Award
International Blues Challenge

References

External links

Blues organizations
Organizations based in Memphis, Tennessee
1980 establishments in Tennessee